Volkswille ('People's Will') was a communist newspaper published in Potsdam, East Germany, from 1945 to 1946. The frequency of publishing shifted from daily, weekly and triweekly. It merged with Märker, forming the newspaper Märkische Volksstimme.

References

German-language newspapers
Newspapers published in Germany
Communist newspapers
Communist Party of Germany
Mass media in Potsdam